Rushdi al-Kikhya (1899– 14 March 1987) was a Syrian political leader who founded the People's party in 1948. Kikhya was elected as a Speaker of the Parliament of Syria between 1949 and 1951, and he was elected five terms as a member of the Syrian Parliament (MP) (1936, 1943, 1947, 1949 and 1954). Kikhiya also served as minister of interior in 1949.

Career 
Rushdi al-Kikhya was born and raised in Aleppo and studied law at the Sorbonne in Paris. 

In 1939, Kikhya clashed with the Bloc leadership, however, over their failure to prevent Turkey's annexation of the Sanjak of Alexandretta, territory in northern Syria that had once been part of the Ottoman Empire.

Kikhya joined Nazem al-Qudsi , also form Aleppo, and campaigned against the election of Shukri al-Quwatli, the National Bloc candidate for the presidency in 1943. In 1948, Kikhiya founded the People's party with Nazem al-Qudsi and Mustafa Bey Barmada. 

Khikhya supported the coup that ousted Husni al-Za'im in August 1949 and allied himself with Syria's new leader, President Hashim al-Atasi. Khikhya became minister of interior in a cabinet headed by Atasi himself that lasted from August to December 1949. Khikhya then became chairman of the Constitutional Assembly that drafted a new constitution for Syria. In September, he became a deputy for Aleppo and was elected speaker of the parliament.

The leadership of the People's Party including Khikhya pushed to form a union with Iraq, to curb any future Israeli eastward expansion. However, Khikhya withdrew from the political life upon the formation of the United Arab Republic in 1958.

He died in 1987 in Nicosia, Cyprus, and was buried there.

References 

1899 births
1987 deaths
Syrian Sunni Muslims
People's Party (Syria) politicians
National Bloc (Syria) politicians
People from Aleppo
20th-century Syrian politicians
Sorbonne University
Speakers of the People's Assembly of Syria
University of Paris alumni
al-Kihkiha family